Sehlabathebe Airport  is an airstrip serving the village of Sehlabathebe in Qacha's Nek District, Lesotho.

See also

Transport in Lesotho
List of airports in Lesotho

References

External links
OurAirports - Sehlabathebe
 HERE Maps - Sehlabathebe
 OpenStreetMap - Sehlabathebe

Airports in Lesotho